Mohd Rashid bin Hasnon (Jawi: محمد راشد بن حسنون; born 2 January 1960) is a Malaysian politician who served as Deputy Speaker of the Dewan Rakyat I under former Speakers Mohamad Ariff Md Yusof and Azhar Azizan Harun from July 2018 to December 2022, Member of Parliament (MP) for Batu Pahat from May 2018 to November 2022, Deputy Chief Minister of Penang I, Member of the Penang State Executive Council (EXCO) under former Chief Minister Lim Guan Eng and Member of the Penang State Legislative Assembly (MLA) for Pantai Jerejak from May 2013 to May 2018. He is a member of the Malaysian United Indigenous Party (BERSATU), a component party of the Perikatan Nasional (PN) coalition and was a member of People's Justice Party (PKR), a component party of the Pakatan Harapan (PH) coalition. He is also Chairman of the World Women Organisation.

Early years, education and career 
Rashid Hasnon was born in Muar, Johor Bahru to Hasnon and Tek. He was educated in Muar High School and later went to Royal Military College, Sungai Besi. He completed his A-Levels in Southampton Technical College, United Kingdom. He obtained a degree in BSc. Control Engineering at the University of Sheffield, UK. He studied his Master in Business Administration (MBA) at National University of Malaysia. Rashid began his first job at Pernas NEC in 1984. He held the position as the head of planning department in Motorola in 1987. He became the chairman of Personal Managers Group which manages all company that is governed under Free Industrial Zone (FTZ) at Bayan Lepas in 2006. He married Datin Hajjah Nor Azizah bt Haron in 1982 and has 5 children.

Political career 
Rashid became the chairman of GERAK Penang in 1999. In 2001, he held the position as PKR State Treasurer. He was one of the founding members of PKR in Penang and has been serving as vice-chairman of Penang State PKR, the opposition party then in Malaysia.

He was elected as Penang State Legislative Assemblyman for Pantai Jerejak in 2013 election with a bigger majority vote than his predecessor and was appointed as the Deputy Chief Minister 1 of Penang. He was sworn into the position which was assigned to PKR since Pakatan Rakyat took over Penang on 9 May 2013 to succeed Dato' Mansor Othman. Rashid was also the Penang State Executive Council Member in the portfolio of Industrial Development & International Trade, Entrepreneurial Development, Cooperative and Community Relation. He was also the deputy-chairman of Perbadanan Bekalan Air Pulau Pinang (PBAPP) board of directors. He was also the Deputy Chairman of Penang Development Corporation (PDC).

In May 2018 election, he went back to his home state Johor and contested the parliamentary seat of Batu Pahat. He successfully defeated his opponents from BN and PAS with majority of 17,894.

International assistance mission 

Rashid had joined the team of volunteers to Aceh and Meulaboh to help victims of tsunami in 2004. In 2009, he led a mission to help Muslims in Cambodia and Southeast Asian countries. In addition, as the chairman of International JIM national, he did not miss out on a relief mission in Gaza (2011) with a Malaysian non-governmental organization, Islamic Organisations Consultative Council (MAPIM), among the earliest mission to bring aid to Gaza after the Mavi Marmara incident.

Controversies
On 22 January 2019, Rashid had purportedly asked to deliver a speech text by the organisers in the event of the launch of the Enhanced Malaysia International Internet Gateway (EM-IIG) High-Speed Broadband project in Shah Alam which wrongly implicated him and he was mistakenly thought to be representing Deputy Prime Minister Dr Wan Azizah Wan Ismail who could not attend it. The Office of the Deputy Prime Minister said in a statement later that Dr Wan Azizah had never approved the speech text that was delivered and had also not delegated anyone to read out the text of the speech at the event. It also denied that the government would extend its full cooperation to the implementation of the EM-IIG project. Rashid had denied that he represented the Deputy Prime Minister at the event. He demanded the organisers to act immediately to correct the situation and clear his name of any confusion or he would consider legal action against them.

Election results

Honours
  :
  Companion of the Order of the Defender of State (DMPN) – Dato' (2013)

See also
 Batu Pahat (federal constituency)
 Pantai Jerejak (state constituency)

Notes 

1960 births
Living people
People from Muar
People from Johor
Malaysian people of Malay descent
Malaysian Muslims
Members of the Dewan Rakyat
Former People's Justice Party (Malaysia) politicians
Malaysian United Indigenous Party politicians
Members of the Penang State Legislative Assembly
Penang state executive councillors
Alumni of the University of Sheffield
National University of Malaysia alumni
21st-century Malaysian politicians